Tristan Weber (born June 29, 2000) is an American soccer player who currently plays for MLS Next Pro side Portland Timbers 2.

Career

Youth 
Weber played high school soccer at San Clemente High School in California, where he was named the United Soccer Coaches National Player of the Year and the Gatorade California Boys Soccer Player of the Year. He also played club soccer with LA Galaxy academy between 2014 and 2016.

College & Amateur 
In 2018, Weber attended the University of Portland to play college soccer, going on to make 14 appearances for the Pilots in his freshman season, tallying three assists. In 2019, Weber transferred to San Diego State University, playing two seasons with the Aztecs, making 28 appearances, scoring three goals and tallying two assists.

Whilst at college, Weber spent time with Orange County FC in the NPSL in 2017, 2018 and 2019. He also spent time with Orange County SC U23 in the USL PDL in 2018, but didn't appear for the team.

Professional
On August 27, 2021, Weber signed with USL Championship side Las Vegas Lights. He made his debut the same day, appearing as a 66th-minute substitute during a 2–3 loss to LA Galaxy II.

On March 8, 2022, Weber signed with USL Championship club Charleston Battery ahead of their 2022 season.

On July 29, 2022, Weber signed with MLS Next Pro side Columbus Crew 2. Following the 2022 season, he was released by Columbus.

Honors
Columbus Crew 2
MLS Next Pro: 2022

References

External links
Portland Pilots bio
San Diego State Aztecs bio

2000 births
Living people
American soccer players
Association football midfielders
Charleston Battery players
Columbus Crew 2 players
Las Vegas Lights FC players
MLS Next Pro players
National Premier Soccer League players
Orange County SC U-23 players
People from Orange County, California
Portland Pilots men's soccer players
Portland Timbers 2 players
San Diego State Aztecs men's soccer players
Soccer players from California
USL Championship players